Anyako is a town in the Volta Region of Ghana. It is bordered at the south by the Keta lagoon. The inhabitants of the town mainly belong to the Ewe tribe. Tracing its establishment to a settlement founded by the Anlos during the migration from Notsie in present-day Togo. Historically the town is the birthplace of The great Ewe poet Hesinor Vinorko Akpalu Akpa. (Torgbui Akpalu), the renown traditional music composer, who was well-known all over the land for his rich repertoire and gift in traditional composition. Charles Kobla Nutornutsi Wovenu, The founder, Apostles’ Revelation Society (ARS) also hailed from Anyako. Kobla Ladzekpo, the founder and director of Zadonu African Music and Dance Company in U.S.A. and Artist El Anatsui. The town has experienced little to no growth over the past thirty years due to sea erosion which affected commercial activities.

Suburbs 

 Konu
 Atigate
 Aborme
 Woeto
 Lashibi
 Aƒegame
 Kpota

Contribution to Ghanaian politics 
Anyako produced many political figures in Ghana's history. The 1st Inspector General of Police of Ghana John Willie Kofi Harlley who was also a former foreign minister of Ghana; and a member of the Presidential Commission that ruled Ghana during the military era of the National Liberation Council came from Anyako.

Culture
Some popular foods eaten by the locals include Akple, Yakayake, Abolo and Gbɔvilolo kalami, Agbeli kaklo kple azi, Ayikple.

Education

Anyako has a senior school and three basic and Junior Schools. The Basic and Junior Schools are E.P. Basic School, A.A. Fia/L.A. Basic and Junior Schools, and R.C. Basic and Junior Schools.

Notable sons 
John Willie Kofi Harlley was a Ghana's first Inspector General of Police of the Ghana Police Service (IGP). He was the deputy chairman of the NLC government and also served in multiple ministerial roles including serving as Minister for Foreign Affairs and Minister for the Interior.
El Anatsui is the best-known contemporary artist from the African continent. He has lived in Nigeria since 1975. He was awarded the Golden Lion for Life Achievement at the Venice Biennale (2015) and has received honorary degrees from Harvard University, University of Cape Town, and Kwame Nkrumah University of Science and Technology, Accra.
Elias Yao Gbadrive Ladzekpo (1902 - 1966) alias "Kortsise" A renowned and prolific composer, cultural musician, founder and leader of the "Britannia" Dance Group of Anyako, Lashibi 
Komla Agbeli Gbedemah was a Ghanaian politician and Minister for Finance in Ghana's Nkrumah government between 1954 and 1961.
 Colonel Ben Ahlijah ( Rtd) was a Commissioner of Industries and Local Government under General Kutu Acheampong and General FWK Akuffo's governments.
Alex Segbefia - Deputy Chief of Staff and Minister of Health during Atta Mills and John Mahama's government respectively.
Isaac Dogboe - Former World Boxing Organization super bantamweight champion.
Chris A. Ackummey- Former Acting Managing Director Ghana Oil Company Limited.
Corporal Patrick Gagbale Attipoe- He was a Ghanaian ex-serviceman and veteran of World War II. He was one of the three veterans shot dead by Major Imray. while on their way to present a petition to Sir Gerald Creasy who was Governor of Gold Coast at the time. The death of these three ex-servicemen led to the 1948 Accra Riots. In his loving memory, his statue has been unveiled at Kpota.

References

Populated places in the Volta Region